Human Hearts is a 1922 American silent rural drama film directed by King Baggot, and produced and distributed by the Universal Film Manufacturing Company. It stars House Peters. It is based on a play of the same name by Hal Reid.

Plot
As described in a film magazine, Tom Logan (Peters), an assistant to his father Paul (Simpson) in his blacksmith shop, falls in love with Barbara Kaye (Hallor), a notorious character who plans to fleece him. Against his father's wishes, Tom marries her and they have a child. Jay Benton (Wallace), a former friend of Barbara's, is released from prison and comes to see Barbara. Tom's father finds them together, and there is a scuffle and a shot and Paul Logan is killed. Jimmy (Hackathorne), Tom's half-wit brother, runs to the village and spreads the news that Tom has killed his own father. Tom is sentenced and convicted to a life sentence. Barbara moves to the city with her child and lives with Benton. Tom saves the life of the warden (Taylor) and gets his sentence reduced. Upon his release, Barbara returns to him and there is a resultant happy ending.

Cast

House Peters as Tom Logan
Russell Simpson as Paul Logan
Gertrude Claire as Ma Logan
George Hackathorne as Jimmy Logan
George West as Old Mose
Lucretia Harris as Carolina
Edith Hallor as Barbara Kaye
Ramsey Wallace as Jay Benton
Mary Philbin as Ruth
Hillard Karr as Seth Bascom
Snitz Edwards as Ran Schreiber
Gene Dawson as Little Barbara
Emmett King as Governor
Wilton Taylor as Warden

Preservation
Human Hearts is a surviving film with a copy at George Eastman House.

References

External links

 (5 minute clip)

1922 films
American silent feature films
Films directed by King Baggot
Universal Pictures films
American films based on plays
1922 drama films
Silent American drama films
American black-and-white films
1920s American films